Valve Corporation is an American video game developer, publisher, and digital distribution company headquartered in Bellevue, Washington. It is the developer of the software distribution platform Steam and the franchises Half-Life, Counter-Strike, Portal, Day of Defeat, Team Fortress, Left 4 Dead, and Dota.

Valve was founded in 1996 by former Microsoft employees Gabe Newell and Mike Harrington. Their debut game, the first-person shooter (FPS) Half-Life (1998), was a critical and commercial success; with its realism, scripted sequences and seamless narrative, it had a lasting influence on the FPS genre. Harrington left in 2000. In 2003, Valve launched Steam, followed by Half-Life 2 in 2004. With advanced physics systems and an increased focus on story and characters, Half-Life 2 received critical acclaim and sold 12 million copies by 2011. In 2006, Valve released the episodic sequel Half-Life 2: Episode One, followed in 2007 by Episode Two, the multiplayer game Team Fortress 2 and the puzzle game Portal. Portal 2 was released in 2011. In 2013, Valve released the multiplayer online battle arena game Dota 2.

Valve released fewer games in the 2010s and experimented with hardware and virtual reality (VR). They entered the hardware market in 2015 with the Steam Machine, a line of gaming computers, which sold poorly, and released the HTC Vive and Valve Index VR headsets. They returned to the Half-Life series in 2020 with Half-Life: Alyx, their flagship VR game. In 2022, Valve released the Steam Deck, a portable gaming system.

Valve uses a flat structure, whereby employees decide what to work on themselves. They develop games through playtesting and iteration, describing game design as a kind of experimental psychology. By 2012, Valve employed around 250 people and was reportedly worth over US$3 billion. Most of Valve's revenue comes from Steam, which controlled 50 to 70% of the market for downloaded PC games in 2011 and generated an estimated $3.4 billion in 2017.

History

Founding and Half-Life (1996–2003) 

Valve was founded as Valve, LLC, in 1996 by former Microsoft employees Gabe Newell and Mike Harrington. Newell had spent the prior 13 years at Microsoft developing Windows, including the Windows 95 port of Doom. Wanting to move onto a new venture using their shared wealth, Newell and Harrington founded Valve, L.L.C. in Kirkland, Washington (about five miles from the Microsoft campus in Redmond), on August 24, 1996, Newell's wedding day. Alternative names considered by Newell and Harrington include Fruitfly Ensemble and Rhino Scar.

Valve's first game was Half-Life, a first-person shooter (FPS) with elements of horror. The development was aided by access to the Quake engine by id Software; Valve modified this engine into their GoldSrc engine. After struggling to find a publisher, Valve eventually signed with Sierra On-Line. Half-Life was released in November 1998 and was a critical and commercial success. With its realism, scripted sequences and seamless narrative, it had a lasting influence; according to IGN in 2014, the history of the FPS genre "breaks down pretty cleanly into pre-Half-Life and post-Half-Life eras".

Valve enlisted Gearbox Software to develop three expansions for Half-Life: Opposing Force (1999), Blue Shift (2001) and Decay (2001). In 1998, Valve acquired TF Software, a group that had made the popular Team Fortress mod for Quake, and remade it for GoldSrc as Team Fortress Classic in 1999. Valve released the software development kit (SDK) for the GoldSrc engine, facilitating numerous user-created mods. They acquired the developers of one popular mod, Counter-Strike, to create a standalone Counter-Strike game. Happy with Valve's success, Harrington left in 2000.

Source, Steam, and Half-Life 2 (2003–2010) 
In 2003, Valve moved to Bellevue, Washington, and reincorporated as Valve Corporation. In 2010, the office moved to a larger location in Bellevue. In 2016, Valve signed a nine-floor lease in the Lincoln Square complex in downtown Bellevue, doubling the size of their offices.

Valve began developing Half-Life 2 six months after the release of the first Half-Life, using its new in-house engine, Source. With advanced physics systems and an increased focus on story and characters, it received critical acclaim upon its release in 2004; by 2011, it had sold 12 million copies. In 2002, Valve launched Steam, a digital storefront and delivery platform. Steam initially offered only Valve games, and was mandatory to install Half-Life 2, but became a publisher of third-party games. As Valve became its own publisher via Steam, it transitioned to a flat organization; outside of executive management, Valve does not have bosses, and the company uses an open allocation system, allowing employees to move between departments at will.

After having taken years to develop Half-Life 2, Valve moved to episodic development, planning to release shorter games more frequently. Half-Life 2: Episode One, the first in a planned trilogy of episodic Half-Life 2 sequels, was released in 2006. Episode Two followed in 2007, alongside the multiplayer game Team Fortress 2 and the puzzle game Portal, developed from the student project Narbacular Drop.

In January 2008, Valve announced the acquisition of Turtle Rock Studios, which was renamed Valve South. Turtle Rock developed Left 4 Dead and Left 4 Dead 2 while associated with Valve. Turtle Rock Studios later spun out of Valve again in March 2010.

Forbes estimated that Valve had grossed $70 million in 2005. Screen Digest analyst Ed Barton estimated Valve's 2010 revenue to be in the "high hundreds of millions of dollars". As of 2011, Valve had an estimated worth of $2 to 4 billion and employed 250 people; according to Newell, this made it more profitable per employee than Google or Apple. Most of Valve's revenue comes from Steam, which controlled 50 to 70% of the market for downloaded PC games in 2011.

Transition to services (2010–2014) 

In 2010, Valve hired IceFrog, the developer of Defense of the Ancients, a Warcraft III mod. IceFrog led the development of a sequel not associated with the Warcraft elements, Dota 2, released in 2013. Alongside Dota 2 in 2011, Valve started The International, an annual eSports tournament for Dota 2 with a prize pool supported by Valve and funds from microtransactions from battle passes purchased by players. Valve released Portal 2 in April 2011. As with the original Portal, Valve employed a Digipen student team to help develop it; the team behind Tag: The Power of Paint implemented the new gel gameplay.

In December 2012, Valve acquired Star Filled Studios, a two-person studio, to open a San Francisco office. Valve ended the operation in August 2013 when they decided it had little benefit. At the 2013 D.I.C.E. Summit, Newell announced that he and film director J. J. Abrams were collaborating to produce a Half-Life or Portal film, as well as a possible game.

Valve released fewer games in the 2010s. Instead, it explored hardware. Newell intended to make Valve more like Nintendo, which develops games in tandem with hardware, allowing them to create innovative games such as Super Mario 64. Valve initially focused on augmented reality, but in 2013 Newell laid off many staff to focus on virtual reality (VR). In 2015, Valve released the Steam Machine, a line of gaming computers, which sold poorly.

Media commentators speculated that Valve's transition to service provider with Steam, which generated an estimated $3.4 billion in 2017, had driven it away from game development. Valve cancelled games including numerous Half-Life projects (including Episode Three), Left 4 Dead 3, a Soulslike game, and a voxel-based game, A.R.T.I. Additional VR projects included SimTrek, developed by members of Kerbal Space Program, as well as a new VR device, Vader, that was determined to be too costly for consumers. According to designer Robin Walker, the abundance of projects that failed to gain traction, with no shared vision, damaged morale. Many players grew frustrated in anticipation of a new Half-Life game.

Source 2, virtual reality and Half-Life: Alyx (2015–present)
Valve announced the Source 2 engine in March 2015 and ported Dota 2 to it that September. That year, Valve collaborated with the electronics company HTC to develop the HTC Vive, a VR headset released in 2016. Valve experimented with VR games, and in 2016 released The Lab, a collection of VR minigames.

Valve recognized that many players wanted a more ambitious VR AAA game, and began exploring the development of a major VR game. They developed several prototypes, with three further VR projects under development by 2017. Finding that the portal systems of their puzzle series Portal were disorienting in VR, they settled on Half-Life. Walker said that Half-Life 3 had been a "terrifyingly daunting prospect", and the team saw VR as a way to return to the series.

Full development of a VR Half-Life game started around late 2016, with the largest team in Valve's history. Valve bought Impulsonic, a developer of 3D audio software, in January 2017 and integrated it into its Bellevue offices. In April 2018, Valve acquired the independent developer Campo Santo, known for the 2016 adventure game Firewatch. Campo Santo planned to develop its own games under Valve, though they initially helped develop Half-Life: Alyx.

In November 2018, Valve released Artifact, a digital collectible card game based on Dota 2, with design by Richard Garfield, the creator of Magic: The Gathering. Artifact had unusual pay-for mechanics to acquire new cards, and did not draw a large playerbase, losing 95% of players months after release. In April 2021, Valve abandoned efforts to reboot the project, saying they had not found enough interested players to justify development. In June 2019, Valve released its second-generation VR hardware, the Valve Index. In the same month, Valve released Dota Underlords into early access, an auto battler based on a Dota 2 community-created mode Dota Auto Chess. 

In March 2020, Valve released Half-Life: Alyx, a VR game. It received acclaim and was described as VR's first killer app. Newell said in January 2021 that the success of Alyx created desire within the company to develop more games, and that several were under development. Valve collaborated with Netflix for Dota: Dragon's Blood, an animated television series based on Dota, to premiere in March 2021. In February 2022, Valve released the Steam Deck, a portable game system that runs on SteamOS.

Structure 

Initially, Valve used a hierarchical structure more typical of other development firms, driven by the nature of physical game releases through publishers that required tasks to be completed by deadlines. However, as Valve became its own publisher via Steam, it found the hierarchal structure was hindering progress.

After completing Half-Life 2, Valve transitioned to a flat organization; outside of executive management, Valve does not have bosses, and uses an open allocation system. Valve's marketing manager, Doug Lombardi, said: "Nobody writes a design doc and hands it to somebody and says, 'you go build this'. It's the teams that are coming up with the ideas and pushing in the directions that they want to take the product." This approach allows employees to work on whatever interests them but requires them to take ownership of their product and mistakes they may make, according to Newell. Newell recognized that this structure works well for some but that "there are plenty of great developers for whom this is a terrible place to work".

Although Valve has no bosses, some employees hold more influence due to seniority or relationships. De facto project leads became "centralized conduits" for organization and sharing information, and decisions are made collectively. Valve uses an "Overwatch" process to gather feedback from senior members, which teams may use or ignore.

The lack of organization structure has led to project cancellations, as it can be difficult to convince other employees to work on them. In 2020, Valve acknowledged that its structure had made it difficult to gather momentum, slowing their output during the 2010s. Their VR projects and Half-Life: Alyx became a turning point, setting short-term studio-wide goals to focus the company. According to Walker, "We sort of had to collectively admit we were wrong on the premise that you will be happiest if you work on something you personally want to work on the most."

Valve time

Valve time is an industry term used jokingly with game releases from Valve, used to acknowledge the difference between the "promised" date for released content stated by Valve and to the "actual" release date; "Valve Time" includes delays but also includes some content that was released earlier than expected. Valve itself has fully acknowledged the term, including tracking known discrepancies between ideal and actual releases on their public development wiki and using it in announcements about such delays. Valve ascribes delays to their mentality of team-driven initiatives over corporate deadlines.

Playtesting 
Valve playtests its games extensively, starting from the beginning of development, and iterates based on the results. Its website states: "We believe that all game designers are, in a sense, experimental psychologists." The Valve writer Chet Faliszek said he initially blamed testers when they failed to engage with designs as expected, but changed his mind when multiple testers had the same problem: "By the third or fourth time, all of a sudden you're realizing, 'I'm an idiot. This is pretty obvious this doesn't work. It's not their fault, it's our fault.'" He gave an example from the development of Left 4 Dead, wherein a texture change caused every tester to miss a ladder and become stuck.

Products

Games 

Valve is the main developer and publisher of the single-player Half-Life and Portal games and the multiplayer games Counter-Strike, Team Fortress 2, Dota 2, Day of Defeat, and Artifact. Valve also published the multiplayer game Left 4 Dead and developed and published Left 4 Dead 2. Unreleased and canceled Valve games include the fantasy role-playing game Prospero and numerous Half-Life projects, including Episode Three. Valve worked with Arkane Studios on The Crossing, which was canceled in May 2009.

Steam 

Valve announced Steam, its digital distribution service, at the 2002 Game Developers Conference. It was launched in September 2003 and was first used to deliver patches and other updates to Valve's online games.

On August 1, 2012, Valve announced revisions to the Steam Subscriber Agreement (SSA) to prohibit class action lawsuits by users against the service provider. By July 2014, there were over 3,400 games available on Steam, with over 150 million registered accounts by January 2018.

Alongside these changes to the SSA, the company also declared publicly the incorporation of Valve S.a.r.l., a subsidiary based in Luxembourg. Valve set up a physical office in Luxembourg Kirchberg. According to Valve's project manager Mike Dunkle, the location was chosen for eCommerce capabilities and infrastructure, talent acquisition, tax advantages and central geographic location – most major partners are accessible, 50% within driving distance.

Valve S.a.r.l. was used to sell games to UK users to avoid paying the full 20% value-added tax (VAT). The tax loophole was expected to close on January 1, 2015. In December 2015, the French consumer group UFC Que Choisir initiated a lawsuit against Valve for several of their Steam policies that conflict or run afoul of French law. One of the reasons was for using the tax loophole. Valve S.a.r.l. ceased business on January 1, 2017, with the main company taking over EU sales again. In August 2017, Valve announced that Steam had reached over 67 million monthly and 33 million daily active users on the platform.

Steam Machine 

Newell has been critical of the direction that Microsoft has taken with making Windows a closed architecture similar to Apple's products, and has stated that he believes that the changes made in Windows 8 are "a catastrophe for everyone in the [personal computer] space". Newell identified the open-source Linux platform as an ideal platform for Steam and said the only thing holding back its adoption is the lack of games.

In 2012, Valve announced that they were working on a console/PC hybrid for the living room, dubbed by media as the "Steam Box". A precursor to such a unit is SteamOS, a freely available Linux-based operating system that builds upon the Steam client functionality that includes media services, live streaming across home networks, game sharing within families, and parental controls. SteamOS was officially announced in September 2013 as the first of several announcements related to the Steam Machine platform as well as their unique game controller. In May 2014, Valve announced that the company's own SteamOS-powered Steam Machine would be delayed until 2015 due to problems with the game controller. In 2015, Alienware, ZOTAC, and CyberPowerPC launched their versions of the Steam Machine. By June 2016, fewer than half a million had been sold. While the Steam Machine line has been effectively canceled, Valve continued to manufacture and sell Steam Controllers until late November 2019, and publishes both mobile apps and software for the Steam Link, allowing in-home streaming.

Steam Deck

Announced in July 2021, the Steam Deck is a hybrid game console similar to the Nintendo Switch. It is primarily a handheld device that supports playing of Steam games, but through a separate dock unit, the console can output to an external monitor and use external power, networking, and USB accessories connected to the dock. The hardware is based on customized AMD Zen 2 and RDNA 2 chipsets. The unit started shipping in February 2022.

Virtual reality
At the Game Developers Conference in March 2015, Valve and Taiwanese electronics company HTC unveiled SteamVR and the HTC Vive—a virtual reality platform and a virtual reality headset. The platform would be distinguished by its "Lighthouse" motion tracking system, where sensors on the headset and its included motion controllers read the position of two base station devices mounted in the play area. This would allow for "room-scale" VR experiences, where the player would not be required to remain in a stationary position in front of a camera and would be able to freely walk around the space.

In November 2017, Microsoft added beta support for the SteamVR service for Windows Mixed Reality headsets. In June 2019, Valve released their own VR headset, known as the Index, positioned as a higher-end device with wider field of view and higher refresh rate. They were accompanied by updated motion controllers, which are strapped against the user's palms and have sensors for detecting input pressure and individual fingers.

Other projects

PowerPlay 
PowerPlay was a technological initiative headed by Valve and Cisco Systems to decrease the latency for online games, announced in January 2000. It was described as a set of protocols and deployment standards at the router level to improve performance. It was claimed that a player with 1000 ms ping was able to play against another player on a LAN connection with no noticeable disadvantage. Initially the protocol was to be released with PowerPlay 1.0 focusing on quality of service (QoS) and later a revision, PowerPlay 2.0 that would focus on functionality. Cisco and Valve intended to deliver a single dial-up service in Q1 2000 in the United States with a 30-day free trial with a bundled copy of Team Fortress modified to support PowerPlay.

The standard was to involve purchasing PowerPlay approved Cisco hardware and infrastructure that had adequate bandwidth and QoS standards that prioritize PowerPlay gaming packets at all others' expense. Newell conceded that Internet service providers (ISPs) would bear the brunt of this expense: "The ISPs are going to need to spend a fair amount of money to be compliant with PowerPlay. But how they get that back is up to them. Some will have a tiered service, and some will just try to recoup their investment through reduced customer churn and customer acquisition." Despite never deploying the dial-up plan featuring PowerPlay 1.0, Valve announced in January 2001 that the standard had indeed been finalized. 12 months after its announcement, PowerPlay was abandoned.

Pipeline 
In July 2013, Valve announced Pipeline, an intern project consisting of ten high school students working together to learn how to create video game content. Pipeline serves to discuss and answer questions that teenagers often ask about the video game industry, and see if it is possible to train a group of teenagers with minimal work experience to work for a company like Valve. The latter purpose breaks Valve's tradition of employing experienced developers, as the company is not good at "teaching people straight out of school".

Legal disputes

Valve Corporation v. Vivendi Universal Games 
Between 2002 and 2005, Valve was involved in a complex legal dispute with its publisher, Vivendi Universal Games (under Vivendi's brand Sierra Entertainment). Valve had entered into a publishing agreement with Sierra to release Half-Life and subsequent games in 1997, with the contract giving Sierra some intellectual property (IP) rights to Valve's games. After Valve began development of Half-Life 2, it agreed a new contract with Sierra in 2001, removing these rights from Sierra and giving Valve some rights for digital distribution. Internally, Valve started work on Steam as a means to digitally distribute these games, and first revealed this project at the March 2002 Game Developers Conference.

By August 2002, Valve had found that Sierra was distributing copies of their games to Internet cafes against the terms of their contracts and filed a lawsuit against Sierra and Vivendi. In addition to claims of copyright infringement, Valve asserted that Sierra breached contract by withholding royalties and delaying the release of Counter-Strike: Condition Zero until after the holiday season. Vivendi and Sierra countersued, stating that Valve had misrepresented their position in the revised 2001 contract since they had been working on Steam at that point as a means to circumvent the publishing agreement. Vivendi sought intellectual property rights to Half-Life and a ruling preventing Valve from using Steam to distribute Half-Life 2.

On November 29, 2004, Judge Thomas Samuel Zilly of the U.S. District Court for the Western District of Washington ruled in favor of Valve. The ruling stated that Vivendi Universal and its affiliates (including Sierra) were not authorized to distribute Valve games, either directly or indirectly, through cyber cafés to end users for pay-to-play activities pursuant to the parties' publishing agreement. In addition, Judge Zilly ruled that Valve could recover copyright damages for infringements without regard to the publishing agreement's limitation of liability clause. Valve posted on the Steam website that the companies had come to a settlement in court on April 29, 2005. Electronic Arts announced on July 18, 2005, that they would partner with Valve in a multi-year deal to distribute their games, replacing Vivendi Universal. As a result of the trial, the arbitrator also awarded Valve $2,391,932.

Valve Corporation v. Activision Blizzard 
In April 2009, Valve sued Activision Blizzard, which acquired Sierra Entertainment after a merger with its parent company, Vivendi Universal Games. Activision had allegedly refused to honor the Valve v. Vivendi arbitration agreement. Activision had only paid Valve $1,967,796 of the $2,391,932 award, refusing to pay the remaining $424,136, claiming it had overpaid that sum in the past years.

Dota intellectual property ownership 
Defense of the Ancients (DotA) was a landmark mod first released in 2003 that created the basis of the genre of multiplayer online battle arena (MOBA). It was originally developed by Kyle Sommer (who goes by the alias Eul) within Blizzard Entertainment's Warcraft III: Reign of Chaos via its world editor, and spawned several similar efforts, notably DotA-Allstars. While there had been several that contributed to DotA-Allstars, the project was managed primarily by Steve "Guinsoo" Feak, and later by "IceFrog". IceFrog was eventually hired by Valve in 2009, with the rights to the DotA intellectual property being sold to Valve the following year. Eul was also hired into Valve by 2010. Valve then subsequently filed trademarks towards a sequel to DotA, titled Dota 2. DotA-Allstars, LLC, a group of former contributors to the DotA-Allstars project, filed an opposing trademark in August 2010 to contest Valve's claim it owned the property rights.

DotA-Allstars, LLC was eventually acquired by Blizzard to start development of Blizzard All-Stars. Blizzard took over the trademark challenge. The United States Patent & Trademark Office initially ruled in Valve's favor. By this point, Riot Games had hired Guinsoo to help develop their own MOBA, League of Legends. As with IceFrog, Feak transferred his rights to the Dota property to Riot, who in turn sold those to Blizzard. Blizzard filed a lawsuit against Valve to challenge Valve's ownership, pitting the rights assigned through IceFrog to Guinsoo at odds. The case Blizzard Entertainment v. Valve Corporation was settled out of court in May 2012; Valve retained the right to use Dota commercially, while Blizzard reserved the right for fans to use Dota non-commercially. Blizzard changed the names of its own projects to remove the Dota term, and renamed Blizzard All-Stars as Heroes of the Storm. Valve's Dota 2 was released in 2013.

In 2014, mobile developers Lilith and  released their games Dota Legends and Heroes Charge, respectively. Both were influenced by Dota and the sequels. In 2017, Valve and Blizzard took joint action against these companies, citing copyright issues related to the Dota names.  argued that the Dota games were a collective work and could not be copyrighted by anyone in particular, but the presiding judge, Charles R. Breyer, felt that, due to the trio's actions as maintainers of the Dota mods, they had a rightful copyright claim to this. Separately, Lilith and  argued that Eul had, in a forum post from September 2004, assigned an open-source copyright license to Dota, which would make Valve and Blizzard's copyright claims void. The case was later heard by a jury.

ACCC v. Valve Corporation 
The Australian Competition & Consumer Commission (ACCC) announced it was taking action against Valve in 2014. On March 29, 2016, Valve was found guilty of breaching Australian consumer law because:
 Valve claimed consumers were not entitled to a refund for digitally downloaded games purchased from Valve via the Steam website or Steam Client (in any circumstances);
 Valve had excluded statutory guarantees and/or warranties that goods would be of acceptable quality; and
 Valve had restricted or modified statutory guarantees and/or warranties of acceptable quality.

During the prosecution of this case, Valve implemented a refund policy for Steam purchases, but the case still reviewed Valve's actions prior to the onset of the lawsuit. Valve appealed the court's determination that it "engaged in misleading or deceptive conduct and made false or misleading representations about consumer guarantees", as well as seeking to appeal the fine, but the Australian higher courts rejected the appeals in December 2017. In January 2018, Valve filed for a "special leave" of the court's decision, appealing to the High Court of Australia. The High Court dismissed this claim in April 2018, asserting that Valve still was liable under Australian law since it sold products directly to its citizens.

UFC Que Choisir v. Valve Corporation 
Consumer rights group UFC Que Choisir, based in France, filed a lawsuit against Valve in December 2015, claiming users should be able to resell their software. The High Court of Paris ruled in favor of UFC Que Choisir in September 2019, stating that Valve must allow the resale of Steam games. Valve stated it will appeal the decision.

Skins gambling 

Valve was named as a defendant in two lawsuits in June and July 2016 related to third-party gambling sites that use the Steamworks API to allow betting with the virtual currency of cosmetic weapon replacement textures, better known as "skins", from Counter-Strike: Global Offensive, which through these sites can be converted from or to real-world money. Both suits assert Valve aiding in underaged gambling. Valve subsequently stated it has no commercial ties with these sites, and that it would demand these sites cease their use of the Steamworks API as they violate the authorized use policies. In October 2016, the Washington State Gambling Commission required Valve to stop the use of virtual skins for gambling on Steam, stating they would face legal repercussions if they failed to co-operate. On October 17, 2016, Valve sent a letter to the Washington State Gambling Commission stating that they had "no business relationship with such gambling sites", asserting that they come into existence, operate, and go out of existence without their knowledge and consent, adding that they were not aware of any such law that Steam or any of their games were violating.

Anti-competitive practices 
In February 2017, the European Commission began investigating Valve and five other publishers—Bandai Namco Entertainment, Capcom, Focus Home Interactive, Koch Media and ZeniMax Media—for anti-competitive practices, specifically the use of geo-blocking through the Steam storefront and Steam product keys to prevent access to software to citizens of certain countries. Such practices would be against the Digital Single Market initiative by the European Union. While the other five companies named are in stages of settling with the EU as of August 2019, Valve has stated it plans to fight the charges, asserting that geo-blocking affects less than 3% of its games, and that it had turned off such geo-blocking within the EU in 2015.

Discrimination lawsuit
In 2016, a former employee filed a suit against Valve alleging poor working conditions and harassment. The jury ruled in favor of Valve in 2017.

Notes

References

External links 

 

 
1996 establishments in Washington (state)
Companies based in Bellevue, Washington
Linux game porters
Video game companies established in 1996
Video game companies of the United States
Video game development companies
Video game publishers